Francis Howell Central High School (FHC) is the third high school created in the Francis Howell School District.  The school is located in Cottleville, Missouri, but a large part of its student population comes from its larger neighbor St. Peters. Home of the Spartans, Francis Howell Central is a four-year comprehensive high school offering programs in college preparatory, vocational, honors/advanced credit, advanced placement and a special education program.

History
FHC opened in the fall of 1997 with only freshmen and sophomore students. The school had been built in a series of phases; much of what is visible today had not yet been constructed at the time of its opening. The school's first principal was Don Muench.  The building opened with relatively few teachers,  due to low student enrollment at the time. Eventually the school expanded to include junior and senior grades as well.

In 2013, the Missouri Supreme Court upheld a law that allowed students attending unaccredited school districts to transfer to other schools. A lawful decision was made that students from a neighboring county's failing Normandy School District, which was predominantly black, would attend the majority white Francis Howell School District.

This led to Francis Howell district parents voicing concerns against the transfer of students even though they would pay out-of-district tuition. The town hall meeting went on for over two hours with almost 3,000 people in attendance. One parent at Francis Howell Central High School stated : "I deserve to not have to worry about my children getting stabbed, or taking a drug, or getting robbed" which was supported by many cheers. Many of these parents were later criticized by some as racist and classist. Other parents drew similarities between their current controversy and that of desegregation busing during the Civil Rights Movement.

In 2014, the Francis Howell School District decided to no longer take out-of-district tuition and the Missouri State Board of Education to reconstitute the Normandy District as the Normandy Schools Collaborative and eliminate its "unaccredited" status.

Athletics
The following MSHSAA sanctioned activities are available at Central:

Fall sports
 Cross country
 Girls' softball
 Marching Band
 Football
 Girls' volleyball
 Boys' soccer
 Girls' tennis
 Boys' swimming
 Girls' golf

Winter sports
 Boys' basketball
 Girls' basketball
 Boys' wrestling
 Girls' swimming
 Winter Guard

Spring sports
 Track
 Baseball
 Boys' rugby
 Girls' soccer
 Boys' golf
 Boys' tennis
 Boys' volleyball
 Girls' lacrosse

Year round
 Bowling
 Cheerleading
Forensics
Pompom

Band
The Spartan Regiment is FHC's marching band. The band raised $2000 in 2010 for the St. James Marching Band, whose members were involved in a bus crash.

Notable alumni
 Pierre Desir – defensive back for the Tampa Bay Buccaneers.

References

External links
 

Educational institutions established in 1997
High schools in St. Charles County, Missouri
Public high schools in Missouri
1997 establishments in Missouri